The 2003 North Devon District Council election took place on 1 May 2003 to elect members of North Devon District Council in Devon, England. The whole council was up for election with boundary changes since the last election in 1999 reducing the number of seats by 1. The Liberal Democrats stayed in overall control of the council.

Election result
The results saw the Liberal Democrats keep their majority on the council with 22 seats, but the Conservatives gained 5 seats to move to 10 councillors. Overall turnout in the election was 45%.

4 Liberal Democrat and 1 independent candidates were unopposed.

Ward results

By-elections

References

2003 English local elections
2003
2000s in Devon